Thies is a north German and Dutch name originating from the given name Matthias. It may refer to
Given name
Thies Christophersen (1918–1997), German Holocaust denier
Thies Kaspareit (born 1964), German equestrian

Surname
Annelies Thies (born 1969), Dutch sailor 
Bill Thies, American computer scientist
Brian Thies, American comic book creator
Dave Thies (born 1937), American professional baseball pitcher
Dré Thies (born 1967), American rower
Dick Thies (born 1938), American actor
Hans-Jürgen Thies (born 1955), German politician
Jake Thies (1926–2013), American Major League Baseball pitcher
Joyce Thies, American writer of romance novels
Nancy Thies (born 1957), American gymnast

References